The Three Tenors: Paris 1998 (re-released with the subtitle The Concert of the Century) is a live album by José Carreras, Plácido Domingo, and Luciano Pavarotti with conductor James Levine. The album was recorded at a Three Tenors concert on 10 July 1998 during celebrations for the FIFA World Cup. The concert took place in front of the Eiffel Tower on the Champ de Mars in Paris, France. The Orchestre de Paris accompanied the singers. The audience at the live concert numbered around 150,000 people. A sound system and large screens were placed along the Champ de Mars for the crowds further back to see and hear the performance. Producer Tibor Rudas claimed prior to the concert that 2 billion viewers were expected to watch the televised performance worldwide.

As in their two previous recorded concerts in Rome in 1990 and Los Angeles in 1994, Spanish tenors Carreras and Domingo and their Italian colleague Pavarotti performed a variety of operatic arias, Neapolitan songs, zarzuela romanzas, art songs, and popular music. Atlantic Records and Warner Music jointly released the audio version of the concert on 18 August 1998, while Universal Music and Decca Records released the video album on VHS and DVD. The album went gold in the United States and France.

Track listing

Tracks 7–14 and 18-26 are medleys.

Chart performance

Year-end charts

Certifications

Audio album certification

Video album certification

Personnel

José Carreras, vocals
Plácido Domingo, vocals
Luciano Pavarotti, vocals
James Levine, conductor
Orchestre de Paris, orchestra
Lalo Schifrin, arranger

References

1998 live albums
1998 classical albums
The Three Tenors albums